Stanley Robert West (8 February 1913 – 13 August 2001) was a British athlete. He competed in the men's high jump at the 1936 Summer Olympics.

West also served in the Royal Air Force during the Second World War.

References

1913 births
2001 deaths
Athletes (track and field) at the 1936 Summer Olympics
British male high jumpers
Olympic athletes of Great Britain
Royal Air Force personnel of World War II
People from Westminster
Athletes from London